Eric Bress is an American screenwriter, film director and producer, probably best known for his work on the Final Destination series and The Butterfly Effect. He frequently collaborates with J. Mackye Gruber.

His most recent project, The Alchemyst: The Secrets of the Immortal Nicholas Flamel, is in development. 
Since 2012 when the rights were optioned by AMPCO Films, he is no longer the screenwriter.

Bress received a secondary education from Hackley School in Tarrytown, New York, and is a graduate of Syracuse University, where he studied film. He is originally from New York. He worked as a sound engineer before becoming a screenwriter.

Filmography

Film

Television 
The numbers in directing and writing credits refer to the number of episodes.

References

External links
 
 Interview with Eric Bress and J. Mackye Gruber

Living people
Year of birth missing (living people)
Place of birth missing (living people)
American male screenwriters
Syracuse University College of Visual and Performing Arts alumni
Hackley School alumni
Screenwriters from New York (state)
American directors